An arthropodicide is a pesticide which acts upon arthropods. The vast majority of arthropodicides used are

 Insecticides

however there are other types. The second most common class is

 Acaricides/miticides.